The Doom Patrol is a superhero team appearing in publications from DC Comics. The original Doom Patrol first appeared in My Greatest Adventure #80 (June 1963). The majority of their foes have been members of their arch group the Brotherhood of Evil. This page lists the known enemies of the Doom Patrol.

Central rogues' gallery 
In alphabetical order (with issue and date of first appearance)

Foes of lesser renown
In chronological order (with issue and date of first appearance)

References

Doom Patrol
Lists of DC Comics characters
Lists of DC Comics supervillains